Paramesius is a genus of hymenopterans in the family Diapriidae.

North American Species

 Paramesius angustipennis Kieffer, 1911 g
 Paramesius belytoides Marshall, 1867 g
 Paramesius bifoveatus Kieffer, 1911 g
 Paramesius brachypterus Thomson, 1858 g
 Paramesius brevipennis Kieffer, 1911 g
 Paramesius cameroni Kieffer, 1911 g
 Paramesius claviscapus Thomson, 1858 g
 Paramesius crassicornis Thomson, 1858 g
 Paramesius dolichocerus Kieffer, 1911 g
 Paramesius dolosus Kieffer, 1911 g
 Paramesius inermis Kieffer, 1910 g
 Paramesius macrocerus Kieffer, 1911 g
 Paramesius nervosus (Nees, 1834) g
 Paramesius pedestris Kieffer, 1911 g
 Paramesius rufipes (Boyer de Fonscolombe, 1832) g
 Paramesius spiniger Kieffer, 1910 g
 Paramesius tenuicornis Thomson, 1858 g
 Paramesius westwoodi Fergusson, 1977 g

Data sources: i = ITIS, c = Catalogue of Life, g = GBIF, b = Bugguide.net

References

Further reading

External links

 

Parasitic wasps
Parasitica
Diapriidae